Neelam or Neelum may refer to:

Places
 Neelum River, India and Pakistan 
 Neelam District, Azad Kashmir, Pakistan
 Neelam (village), Azad Kashmir, Pakistan

Other uses
 Neelam (film), 2013 Tamil drama film
 Neelam (given name), including a list of people with the name
 Neelam (mango), a mango cultivar
 Neelam (Tamil novel), part of Venmurasu by Jeyamohan, written in 2014
 Neelam, an actress in movies such as Chori Chori (1956)

See also
 Nilam (disambiguation)